Millwood is a city in Spokane County, Washington, United States. The population was 1,786 at the 2010 census. Millwood is a suburb of Spokane, and is surrounded on three sides by the city of Spokane Valley. The Spokane River flows along the northern edge of the city.

Government 
The city government is organized using the Mayor-Council form. The mayor as of November 2022 is Kevin Freeman, who was first elected in November 2013 and took office in January 2014. In November 2017, he was elected to his second term. Freeman is simultaneously a member of the board of directors for the Spokane Regional Health District, and the Spokane Regional Clean Air Agency. The city council consists of five members, who are elected to serve terms of four years.

History

Millwood was officially incorporated on October 26, 1927. It was named for the local sawmill.

According to the Tacoma Public Library's Washington Place Names database: "In 1900, it was chosen as a station by the Spokane-Coeur d'Alene Electric Railway, and was named Woodard's for the family who owned the land along the railway route. When Inland Empire Paper Company built a paper mill they requested a name change to Milltown. Railway officials refused the change unless the Woodard family agreed. A compromise resulted, using the word mill combined with the first four letters of Woodard. It was incorporated October 27, 1927."

The Rosebush House, located in the center of Millwood, "is one of Millwood's best preserved homes" and is listed on the U.S. National Register of Historic Places.

Geography

Millwood is located at  (47.685693, -117.284297).

The topography of the city is mostly flat as it lies on the floor of the Spokane Valley, though it does slope gently down towards the north. The northern edge of town is defined by the Spokane River, where the terrain promptly drops about 20 feet down to the river bank.

Two major arterials pass through Millwood. Argonne Road bisects the city before crossing the Spokane River, providing the only river crossing for automobiles between Green Street in Spokane, five miles to the west, and Trent Avenue three miles to the east. Trent Avenue, carrying Washington State Route 290, marks the southern limit of the city. The intersection of Argonne and Trent is home to a shopping center. The Argonne exit of Interstate 90 is located half-a-mile south of Millwood.

West Valley High School, which serves Millwood and surrounding areas, is located on the western boundary of the town.

Climate
This region experiences warm (but not hot) and dry summers, with no average monthly temperatures above 71.6 °F.  According to the Köppen Climate Classification system, Millwood has a warm-summer Mediterranean climate, abbreviated "Csb" on climate maps.

Demographics

2010 census
As of the census of 2010, there were 1,786 people, 751 households, and 467 families living in the town. The racial makeup of the town was 94.4% White, 0.6% African American, 1.3% Native American, 1.1% Asian, 0.3% Pacific Islander, 0.6% from other races, and 1.7% from two or more races. Hispanic or Latino of any race were 1.9% of the population.

There were 751 households, of which 30.2% had children under the age of 18 living with them, 46.2% were married couples living together, 11.2% had a female householder with no husband present, 4.8% had a male householder with no wife present, and 37.8% were non-families. 31.2% of all households were made up of individuals, and 10.8% had someone living alone who was 65 years of age or older. The average household size was 2.37 and the average family size was 2.94.

The median age in the town was 40.1 years. 22.6% of residents were under the age of 18; 7.3% were between the ages of 18 and 24; 27.5% were from 25 to 44; 29.6% were from 45 to 64; and 13% were 65 years of age or older. The gender makeup of the town was 49.8% male and 50.2% female.

2000 census
As of the census of 2000, there were 1,649 people, 741 households, and 457 families living in the town. The population density was 2,395.7 inhabitants per square mile (922.7/km2). There were 779 housing units at an average density of 1,131.7 per square mile (435.9/km2). The racial makeup of the town was 95.27% White, 0.55% African American, 0.42% Native American, 1.03% Asian, 0.12% Pacific Islander, 0.49% from other races, and 2.12% from two or more races. Hispanic or Latino of any race were 1.46% of the population.

There were 741 households, out of which 24.2% had children under the age of 18 living with them, 46.7% were married couples living together, 10.9% had a female householder with no husband present, and 38.2% were non-families. 31.2% of all households were made up of individuals, and 12.1% had someone living alone who was 65 years of age or older. The average household size was 2.23 and the average family size was 2.79.

In the town the population was spread out, with 20.8% under the age of 18, 7.9% from 18 to 24, 30.1% from 25 to 44, 25.3% from 45 to 64, and 15.9% who were 65 years of age or older. The median age was 40 years. For every 100 females, there were 93.5 males. For every 100 females age 18 and over, there were 91.8 males.

The median income for a household in the town was $34,565, and the median income for a family was $40,441. Males had a median income of $31,292 versus $22,500 for females. The per capita income for the town was $17,911. About 8.0% of families and 11.0% of the population were below the poverty line, including 18.2% of those under age 18 and 5.6% of those age 65 or over.

References

Cities in Spokane County, Washington
Cities in Washington (state)